Daniel ("Dal") McNulty (20 June 1920 – 21 October 1996) was an Irish composer distinguished for his contributions to inspirational church music.

Life
McNulty was born in Dublin and was blinded by an accident at age 4. and attended St. Mary's School for the Blind, studied at the Royal Irish Academy of Music and received a BMus (Bachelor of Music degree) from University College Dublin in 1944. He was organist and choirmaster at St. John's Augustinian Church, Dublin, from 1939, where he founded a boys choir, the Austin Singers. From 1967 he took on an additional appointment as organist of the newly opened Church of the Holy Spirit, Ballyroan. By external examination he also became a Fellow of the Royal College of Organists, London (1942). His organ recitals were with regularity broadcast on RTÉ and Vatican Radio. It is also for his compositions of sacred choral music, synthesizing elements of Irish folk song, for which McNulty was knighted to the Order of St. Gregory by Pope John Paul II in 1984. He died in Dublin.

Music
McNulty's compositions divide into three periods. These are an early period of sacred choral works; a middle period, consisting almost exclusively of orchestral and instrumental works; and a third period again of sacred choral works. His most renowned works are five masses, the first of which (1968) introduced his late period of composition and his return to exclusive composition of sacred choral music. These masses are still being sung in some Roman Catholic churches in the Republic of Ireland as part of the Sunday Liturgy. McNulty's secular or middle period compositions include Divertimento (for orchestra), three sinfoniettas (no. 1: The Four Provinces, 1957; no. 2, The Shamrock, 1958; no. 3, 1965), two piano concertinos (both 1964), Captain Thompson's Exploits (piano and orchestra), arrangements of Irish traditional music, solo piano pieces and songs.

References

1920 births
1996 deaths
20th-century classical composers
Alumni of University College Dublin
Blind musicians
Irish blind people
Classical composers of church music
Irish choral conductors
Irish classical composers
Irish male classical composers
20th-century conductors (music)
20th-century male musicians